is a private junior college in Midori-ku, Yokohama, Kanagawa Prefecture, Japan, established in 1989.

External links
 Official website Official website 

Educational institutions established in 1989
Private universities and colleges in Japan
Universities and colleges in Yokohama
Japanese junior colleges
1989 establishments in Japan